Byrsonima ophiticola is a species of plant in the Malpighiaceae family. It is endemic to Puerto Rico.

References

ophiticola
Endemic flora of Puerto Rico
Data deficient plants
Taxonomy articles created by Polbot